Farewell Summer is a 1992 Vietnamese 35mm romance film adapted from Nguyễn Đông Thức's 1992 novel of the same name. The film was produced by Giaiphong Film Studio and directed by Lê Hoàng Hoa.

Plot
This romance comedy film follows the story of the life and loves of four female pupils whose names begin with the letter "H" (Hằng-Hạ-Hoa-Hân) and the male student Long before their graduation.

Cast
 Việt Trinh ... Hằng
 Hồng Hạnh ... Hạ
 Hương Giang ... Hoa
 Bảo Hạnh ... Hân
 Lê Công Tuấn Anh ... Long
 Thiệu Ánh Dương ... Ngôn
 Lê Cung Bắc ... Mr. Quang – Hằng's father
 Kim Xuân ... Mrs. Quang – Hằng's mother
 Quang Đại ... Uncle Đăng
 Hoàng Phúc ... Đoàn Hùng
 Hữu Luân ... Teacher Minh
 Cao Thùy ... Teacher Tùng
 Lê Bình ... Teacher Ân
 Thụy Giao ... Trinh
 Kim Ngọc ... Hạ's mother
 Trần Ngân ... Thiện
 Tường Vân ... Principal
 Trọng Hải ... Vũ
 Xuân Bình ... Hiển

Production
Location at Marie Curie High School in Ho Chi Minh City and somewhere in Dak Nong, began since 13 April 1992.

 Camera : Nguyễn Hòe, Minh Tuấn
 Designer : Phạm Nguyên Cẩn
 Costume : Ngọc Điệp
 Sound : Quang Đạo
 Music : Thanh Tùng (Farewell summer / Vĩnh biệt mùa hè), Từ Huy (? / Mong đợi ngậm ngùi), Nguyễn Ngọc Thiện (? / Cô bé dỗi hờn)
 Singer : Cẩm Vân and someones

References

External links
 永別夏天
 The best Vietnamese films about the schoolage
 Farewell summer – The nostalgically song of the schoolage

1992 films
Lê Hoàng Hoa
Vietnamese-language films
Vietnamese romance films
Vietnamese teen films
Films about families
Films based on works by Vietnamese writers
Films set in schools
Films set in Vietnam
Films shot in Vietnam
1990s teen romance films
Films set in the 1990s